Cochlospermum religiosum is a flowering plant from the tropical region of Southeast Asia and the Indian Subcontinent. It is a small tree growing to a height of  usually found in dry deciduous forests. 
The name religiosum derives from the fact that the flowers are used as temple offerings. It is also known as silk-cotton tree because the capsules containing the seeds have a fluffy cotton-like substance similar to kapok. Another common name is buttercup tree because its yellow and bright flowers look like large-sized buttercups.

In Theravada Buddhism, this plant is said to have used as the tree for achieved enlightenment, or Bodhi by nineteenth Buddha called "Siddhaththa - සිද්ධත්ථ". The plant is known as කිණිහිරියා (Kinihiriyaa) in Sinhala, and කණිකාර (Kanikaara) in Sanskrit..

Gallery

References

External links

religiosum
Flora of the Indian subcontinent
Flora of Myanmar